The Varkud satellite (VS) ribozyme is an RNA enzyme that carries out the cleavage of a phosphodiester bond.

Introduction
Varkud satellite (VS) ribozyme is the largest known nucleolytic ribozyme and found to be embedded in VS RNA. VS RNA is a long non-coding RNA exists as a satellite RNA and is found in mitochondria of Varkud-1C and few other strains of Neurospora. VS ribozyme contains features of both catalytic RNAs and group 1 introns. VS ribozyme has both cleavage and ligation activity and can perform both cleavage and ligation reactions efficiently in the absence of proteins. VS ribozyme undergo horizontal gene transfer with other Neurospora strains. VS ribozymes have nothing in common with other nucleolytic ribozymes.

VS RNA has a unique primary, secondary, and tertiary structure. The secondary structure of the VS ribozyme consists of six helical domains (Figure 1). Stem loop I forms the substrate domain while stem-loop II-VI forms the catalytic domain. When these 2 domains are synthesized in vitro separately, they can perform the self-cleavage reaction by trans-acting The substrate binds into a cleft which is made by two helices. The likely active site of the ribozyme is a very important nucleotide A756. The A730 loop and A756 nucleotide are critical to its function since they participate in the phosphoric transfer chemistry activity of the ribozyme

The Origin
VS RNA is transcribed as a multimeric transcript from VS DNA. VS DNA contains a region coding reverse transcriptase necessary for replication of the VS RNA. Once transcribed VS RNA undergoes a site specific cleavage. VS RNA self-cleaves at a specific phosphodiester bond to produce a monomeric and few multimeric transcripts. These transcripts then undergo a self-ligation and form a circular VS RNA. This circular VS RNA is the predominant form of VS found in Neurospora. VS ribozyme is a small catalytic motif embedded within this circular VS RNA. The majority of VS RNA is made up of 881 nucleotides

Structure of the Ribozyme

In the natural state, a VS ribozyme motif contains 154 nucleotides that fold into six helices. Its RNA contains a self-cleavage element which is thought to act in the processing of intermediates made through the process of replication. The H-shaped structure of the ribozyme is organized by two three-way junctions which determine the overall fold of the ribozyme. A unique feature of the structure of ribozyme is that even if the majority of helix IV and distal end of helix VI would be deleted there would be no significant loss of activity However, if the lengths of helix III and V were to be changed there would be major loss of activity. The base bulges of the ribozyme, helices II and IV have very important structural roles since replacing them with other nucleotides does not affect their activity. Basically, VS ribozyme's activity is very dependent on the local sequence of the two three-way junctions. The three-way junction present in the VS ribozyme is very similar to the one seen in the small (23S) subunit of rRNA.

The Active Site of Ribozyme
The active sites of the ribozyme can be found in the helical junctions, the bulges and the lengths of the critical helices those being III and V. There is one important area found in the internal loop of helix VI called A730, a single base change in this loop would lead to  decreased loss of cleavage activity but no significant changes in the folding of the ribozyme occur. Other mutations which affect the activity of the ribozyme are methylation, suppression of thiophilic Manganese ions at the A730 site

Possible Catalytic Mechanism
The A730 loop is very important in the catalytic activity of the ribozyme. The ribozyme functions like a docking station where it will dock the substrate into the cleft between helices II and VI to facilitate an interaction between the cleavage site and A730 loop. This interaction makes an environment to which catalysis can proceed in a way similar to interactions seen in the hairpin ribozyme. Within the A730 loop, a  substitution of A756 by G, C or U will lead to a 300-fold loss of cleavage and ligation activity.

The proof that A730 loop is the active site of the VS ribozyme is very evident, and that A756 plays an important role in its activity. The cleavage reaction works by an SN2 reaction mechanism. The nucleophilic attack of the 2’-oxygen on the 3’-phosphate will create a cyclic 2’3’ phosphate by the 5’-oxygen leaving. The ligation reaction occurs in reverse in which the 5’-oxygen attacks the 3’-phosphate of the cyclic phosphate. The way that both of these reactions are facilitated is by general acid-base catalysis which strengthen the oxygen nucleophile by removing bonded proteins and stabilizing the oxyanion leaving groups through protonation. It is also important to add that if a group is behaving as a base in the cleavage reaction then it must act as an acid in the ligation reaction. Solvated metal ions act in general acid-base catalysis, where the metal ions might act as a Lewis acid which polarize phosphate oxygen atoms. Another important factor in the rate of ligation reaction is the pH dependence which corresponds to a pKa of 5.6, which is not a factor in the cleavage reaction . This particular dependence requires a protonated base at position A756 of the ribozyme.

Another proposed catalytic strategy is the stabilization of a pentavalent phosphate of the reaction transition state. This mechanism would probably involve the formation of hydrogen bonds as seen in the hairpin ribozyme  Furthermore, the proximity of active site groups to each other and their orientation in space would contribute to the catalytic mechanism taking place. This might bring the transition state and the substrate closer for the legation reaction to occur.

Catalysts
Very high concentration of bivalent and monovalent cation increase the efficiency of the cleavage reaction. These cations facilitate the base pairing of the ribozyme with the substrate. VS cleavage rate can be accelerated by high cation concentration as well as by increasing RNA concentration. Therefore, a  low concentration of any of these is rate-limiting. The cations' role is considered to be charge neutralizing in the folding of RNA rather than acting as a catalyst.

Hypothesis For Evolution of VS Ribozyme
1. A molecular fossil of RNA world which has retained both cleavage and ligation functions.

2. VS Ribozyme later acquired one or more of its enzymatic activities.

RNA mediated cleavage and ligation is found in group 1 and group 2 self-splicing RNAs. VS RNA contains many conserved sequence characteristics to group 1 introns. However VS ribozyme splice site is different from group 1 intron splice site and VR ribozyme self-cleaving site is outside of the core of the group 1 intron. In the cleavage reaction VS ribozyme produce 2’,3’ -cyclic phosphate and the group 1 introns produce 3’-hydroxyl. Functional similarity with group 1 introns and then mechanistically being different from the introns support this hypothesis that VS ribozyme is a chimera formed by insertion of a novel catalytic RNA into group 1 introns.

External links
 Nucleotide sequence and annotation of the VS DNA that encodes the VS ribozyme (at the National Center for Biotechnology Information Web site)

References

Non-coding RNA
Ribozymes